Uru of Ch'imu is an extinct language of the Uros, an Amerindian people. Speakers lived on reed islands in Puno Bay in western Lake Titicaca in Peru.

Ch'imu Uru was discovered in 1929 by Lehmann, whose notes are in the Library of the Ibero-American Institute in Berlin. Torero (1992) claims that Uru of Ch'imu is the most divergent of the three Uru–Chipaya languages.

References

Languages of Peru
Uru–Chipaya languages
Languages attested from the 1920s
Lake Titicaca